Balderhead Reservoir is a reservoir in Baldersdale, County Durham, England. Balderhead Reservoir was commissioned by the Tees Valley and Cleveland Water Board (TVCWB) to increase water supply to Teesdale and Teesside.

History
In 1956, an upsurge in the chemical industry on Teesside led ICI to negotiate increased water supply from the Tees Valley Water Board. The first site considered, Cow Green, was above Cauldron Snout and was in a sensitive habitat area, so Balderhead was built instead. The site was initially built as a direct supply route of water to Teesside, but later became a river-regulating reservoir, ensuring that water was available for the River Tees. Cow Green Reservoir was built later, though the approval process was protracted due to the loss of habitat for the Teesdale violet plant. Balderhead, which was originally in the North Riding of Yorkshire, was approved for recreational activities by the Yorkshire Naturalists' Union in the same year that it was opened, there being no objections on wildfowl grounds.

Balderhead Reservoir was constructed upstream of two existing reservoirs, Blackton and Hury, and added  to the storage capacity on the River Balder. Construction of the Balderhead dam began in 1961 and was finished in 1964, with the reservoir being filled during 1965.

The water quality is assessed as moderate for ecology and good for its chemical composition.

Under the Water Act 1973, ownership of the TVCWB's reservoirs, which included the three Baldersdale reservoirs and two others — Selset and Grassholme — on the River Lune a short distance to the north, was transferred to the Northumbrian Water Authority (NWA). In 1989, NWA was privatised, and the reservoirs are now owned and operated by Northumbrian Water.  All five reservoirs supply a water treatment works at Lartington, just south of Cotherstone.

Recreationally, the reservoir is used by the Teesdale Sailing and Watersports Club for windsurfing, canoeing and kite surfing.

See also
 List of reservoirs and dams in the United Kingdom

Notes

References

Drinking water reservoirs in England
Reservoirs in County Durham